Raasaiyya is a 1995 Indian Tamil-language masala film directed by debutant R. Kannan and produced by T. Siva, starring Prabhu Deva and Roja. The film revolves around the life struggle and love life of the character played by Prabhu Deva. It was released on 24 August 1995.

Plot 
Raasaiyya lives with his grandfather, Rathnavel, a kind-hearted and honest man in a small town in rural Southern India. Rathnavel is very easy-going and permits Raasaiyya to indulge in many precocious activities. When young and beautiful Anitha comes to stay for a few days with Rathnavel, both Raasaiyya and she fall in love with each other and would like to marry. But Raasaiyya is unable to assert himself, and Anitha's marriage is arranged with a NRI groom settled in the US. Rathnavel would like to present a decent dowry for Anitha, which includes a priceless diamond necklace. Unable to bear his separation from his sweetheart, Rasaiya decides to tell Rathnavel about this, but before he could do so, he finds out that his biological mother, Pandiamma, is still alive, but will not have anything to do with him. Watch what happens when Raasaiyya finally meets her and finds out the secret why she abandoned him in his childhood.

Cast

Prabhu Deva as Rasaiya
Roja as Anitha
Vijayakumar as Rathnavel
Raadhika as Madhavi 
M. N. Nambiar as Swamy
Vadivelu as Kili
Vinu Chakravarthy as Ramasamy
Thyagu as Ramasamy's son
Thalaivasal Vijay as Kaalai
Hemanth Ravan as Groom
R. Sundarrajan as Kili's cousin
Mannangatti Subramaniam as Villager
Nair Raman as Villager
R. N. K. Prasad as Groom's father
Ganthimathi as Servant
Radhabhai as Groom's mother
Kovai Senthil as Butcher
King Kong as Villager
Krishnamoorthy as Villager (uncredited role)
Ajay Rathnam as Man in Raasaiyya's dream (uncredited role)

Soundtrack
The music was composed by Ilaiyaraaja, with lyrics by Vaali.

 Hindi version
"Mastana Mastana Yeh Dil" - Alka Yagnik, Kumar Sanu
"Tere Pyar Ki Hai" - Sadhana Sargam, Vinod Rathod
"Laage Nahin Mora Jiyara" - Kavita Krishnamurthy, Sonu Nigam
"Chahunga Main Tumko" - Sadhana Sargam, Sudesh Bhosle
"Aaj Ho Chahe Kal" - Leonara Isaac, Udit Narayan
"Pyar Ka Naam Super Hit Hai" - Bali Brahmbhatt, Leonara Isaac

Release and reception
T. K. Balaji from Indolink called it "an absolute waste of time and money and above all an insult to your intelligence". K. Vijiyan of New Straits Times called the story ordinary, and said the film was strictly for fans of Prabhu Deva and Roja. R. P. R. of Kalki wrote that sentiment, heroism, dance and songs, comedy and other spices are all there, but everything in its separate route; while mixing all together, the screenwriter heavily messed up, so after the break it feels like one person can sit casually on the three chairs and watch it. The film became a box-office bomb.

References

External links
 

1990s masala films
1990s Tamil-language films
1995 films
Films scored by Ilaiyaraaja